Megistostegium microphyllum is a plant in the family Malvaceae. It is endemic to Madagascar.

Description
Its glabrous leaves are orbicular to elliptical in shape. The flowers are erect with an orange to red epicalyx and a light green to light pink corolla. The pollen is purple when fresh.

Distribution and habitat
Megistostegium microphyllum is found at numerous locations throughout southern Madagascar, including in protected areas. Its habitat is forests from sea level to about  altitude.

Threats
Threats to Megistostegium in general include grazing by goats, invasive plants competing for limited water supplies and the possible extinction of pollinators. The preliminary conservation status of M. microphyllum is Vulnerable.

Uses
The bark, leaves and twigs of M. microphyllum are locally used to treat conditions including eye ailments and stomach aches. The branches are sometimes used for decorative purposes.

References

Hibisceae
Endemic flora of Madagascar
Plants described in 1915